Tytus Adam Działyński (1796–1861, son of Ksawery, father to Jan Kanty) was a Polish political activist and protector of arts and a Prussian politician.

Biography 
He was a publisher of historical sources important for the Polish history, founder of Kórnik Library (Biblioteka Kórnicka), co-founder of Poznań Industrial Society (Towarzystwo Przemysłowe w Poznaniu), the Poznań Society of Friends of Arts and Sciences (Poznańskie Towarzystwo Przyjaciół Nauk) and the president of the latter since 1858. He was also a participant of the November Uprising (1830/31) and Spring of Nations (1848). He was also a member of provincial parliament of the Grand Duchy of Poznan (1841-1846) and of the Prussian House of Representatives (1851-1853, 1858-1861).

Publications 
 The Lithianian Statute (Statut litewski, 1841)
 Źródłopisma do dziejów unii Korony Polskiej i Wielkiego Księstwa Litewskiego (1856–61) Sources to the history of union of the Crown of Poland and the Grand Duchy of Lithuania
 Acta Tomiciana (vol. 1–8, 1852–60).

References 
 Witold Jakóbczyk, Przetrwać na Wartą 1815-1914, Dzieje narodu i państwa polskiego, vol. III-55, Krajowa Agencja Wydawnicza, Warszawa 1989

1796 births
1861 deaths
Politicians from Poznań
Polish politicians
People of the Revolutions of 1848
People from the Grand Duchy of Posen
November Uprising participants
Members of the Sejm (Provinziallandtag) of Posen
Members of the Prussian House of Representatives
Tytus